Shuka Oyama (小山修加 Oyama Shuka, born September 25, 1980) is a Japanese volleyball player who plays for Hisamitsu Springs.

Profiles
She was born in Fushun, Liaoning.
Chinese name is Wang Jiao.
She was a High Jump player in China.
She came to Japan for the nursing of her grandmother in 1996.
She was naturalized in Japan in 2002.

Clubs
Sumanourajoshi High School → Hisamitsu Springs (2001-)

National team
 2006-2007

Honours
2006 - 6th place in the FIVB Volleyball Women's World Championship in Japan

References

External links
FIVB Biography
Officialsite

Chinese emigrants to Japan
Japanese women's volleyball players
Naturalized citizens of Japan
Living people
1980 births
Asian Games medalists in volleyball
Volleyball players at the 2006 Asian Games
Medalists at the 2006 Asian Games
Asian Games silver medalists for Japan